The 1980 Tolly Cobbold Classic was the second edition of the professional invitational snooker tournament, which took place in February 1980.
The tournament was played at the Corn Exchange in Ipswich, and featured four professional players competing in a round-robin; the two players at the top of the group contested the final, and a play-off was held to determine the third-placed player.

Alex Higgins won the title for the second time in succession, beating Dennis Taylor 5–4 in the final.

Group phase

All matches in the group phase were played over four frames. Results were as follows.

  Alex Higgins 4–0 Dennis Taylor 
  Alex Higgins 3–1 John Virgo 
  Alex Higgins 2–2 Terry Griffiths 
  Dennis Taylor 4–0 John Virgo 
  Dennis Taylor 3–1 Terry Griffiths 
  John Virgo 3–1 Terry Griffiths

Final 
Source:

Third-place play-off
Griffiths and Virgo played off for third place.

References

Tolly Cobbold Classic
Tolly Cobbold Classic
Tolly Cobbold Classic
Tolly Cobbold Classic